Heriberto de la Fe (born 20 July 1941) is a Spanish former swimmer. He competed in the men's 200 metre butterfly at the 1960 Summer Olympics.

References

External links
 

1941 births
Living people
Spanish male butterfly swimmers
Olympic swimmers of Spain
Swimmers at the 1960 Summer Olympics
Sportspeople from Las Palmas